The 2008–09 season was a season of reserve and youth football in Scotland. The season commenced in August 2008.

Scottish Premier Reserve League

Scottish Premier under-19 League

Youth Cup competitions

Scottish Youth Cup

Final

East of Scotland shield

National teams

Scotland Under-21 team

Scotland Under-19 team

Scotland Under-17 team

Notes and references

Youth